Paul Richard Heinrich Blasius (9 August 1883 – 24 April 1970) was a German fluid dynamics physicist. He was one of the first students of Prandtl.

Blasius provided a mathematical basis for boundary-layer drag but also showed as early as 1911 that the resistance to flow through smooth pipes could be expressed in terms of the Reynolds number for both laminar and turbulent flow. After six years in science he changed to Ingenieurschule Hamburg (today: University of Applied Sciences Hamburg) and became a Professor. On 1 April 1962 Heinrich Blasius celebrated his 50th anniversary in teaching. He was active in his field until he died on 24 April 1970.

One of his most notable contributions involves a description of the steady two-dimensional boundary-layer that forms on a semi-infinite plate that is held parallel to a constant unidirectional flow .

Correlations
First law of Blasius for turbulent Fanning friction factor:

 

Second law of Blasius for turbulent Fanning friction factor:

 

Law of Blasius for friction coefficient in turbulent pipe flow:

See also
Blasius function

Notes

References
 Hager, W.H., "Blasius: A life in research and education," Experiments in Fluids, 34: 566–571 (2003)
 Blasius, H., "Das Aehnlichkeitsgesetz bei Reibungsvorgängen in Flüssigkeiten", Mitteilungen über Forschungsarbeiten auf dem Gebiete des Ingenieurwesens, vol.134, VDI-Verlag Berlin (1913)

External links
 

1883 births
1970 deaths
20th-century German physicists
Fluid dynamicists